Sydonia was an alternative rock/metal band formed in 1997 in Melbourne, Victoria. The band consisted of Dana Roskvist, Adam Murray, Sean Bailey and Sam Haycroft, who was replaced by Ant Connelly, after he left to pursue other ventures.

The band has released four EPs (Sojourn, I'd Say No, Subordinate), the full-length album Given To Destroyers through MGM and Reality Kicks through MGM as well. Several singles have had airplay on Triple J, Triple M and Channel V. Their third album is in production now, with Tom Larkin from Shihad assisting on production alongside the band.

They have toured with notable bands such as Stone Sour, Slipknot, Machine Head, Lamb of God and Korn, as well as fellow Australians Dead Letter Circus and Mammal.

History

Early history (2003–2005)

Sydonia was originally formed in 1998 in Noosa Heads, Queensland Australia.

2006
Following the three EPs and many years of honing their sound and identity as a band, Sydonia recorded their debut album in April 2006. Given To Destroyers, taking its name from the single "No Woman's Land", was recorded over 14 days in Backbeach Studio with producer DW Norton. Despite offering distribution deals to several independent labels, Sydonia eventually elected to release the album independently in September 2006 with distribution through Green Media (MGM) Australia.

2007
 A headlining national tour of Australia.
 Personally invited to tour Australia with Lamb of God (USA).
 First Given To Destroyers single "Sorry" video received multiple screenings on Channel V and RAGE.
 "Sorry" and second single "No Woman's Land" received regular airplay on Triple J.
 Received awards at the "Noisies" Award Night.
 Toured the east coast of Australia with Stone Sour (USA).
 Subsequently invited to tour the US with Stone Sour and Dirty Little Rabbits (USA). This is later documented on the band's DVD Through A Lens Is All We Are.

2008
 Toured the east coast of Australia with Mammal.
 Third album single "Taste More" video featured on "New Videos" on Channel V website.
 Personally invited to tour Australia nationally with Slipknot (USA) and Machine Head (USA).

2009
 Toured the east coast of Australia to launch Through a Lens Is All We Are, a DVD that documents their United States tour with Stone Sour and Dirty Little Rabbits, as well as various Australian tours.
 Toured around Australia with Dead Letter Circus on the "Space on the Wall" tour.
 Another headlining tour of Australia.

2010
 Toured the east coast of Australia with American act Between the Buried and Me.
 Began work on upcoming second full-length album.
 Had single "Oceans of Storms" from new album mixed by Colin Richardson (Slipknot, Machine Head, Trivium) with assistance from Martyn 'Ginge' Ford and Carl Bown.
 Toured nationally with Dead Letter Circus for their This is a Warning album tour.
 Toured nationally with Korn for their "Korn III: Remember Who You Are" tour.

2011–now
Sydonia released their 2nd Full-length album Reality Kicks in 2014 (with crowdfunding help through Pozible) through MGM Distribution and signed to Pricewar Music for Management. They toured the album with Helm and Red Bee and then went on to play shows with Trivium and In Flames, as well as Snot and Hed PE in Melbourne and at El Grande Festival in Brisbane alongside Dream On, Dreamer and Voyager. 2014 saw them play at Bigsound in Brisbane, Australia's largest Music Conference.  2016 saw them sign to Premier Artists for bookings in Australia/NZ. On 11 January 2017 Sydonia announced its disbanding via a post on their Official Facebook Page.

Discography

EPs
Sojourn (1998)
I'd Say No (2003)
Subordinate (2004)
 (2005)
Waiting for Words That Don't Exist (2012)

Albums
Given To Destroyers (2006)
Reality Kicks (2014)

Singles
"Sorry" (2006)
"No Woman's Land" (2007)
"Taste More" (2008)
"Ocean of Storms" (2010)
"Reality Kicks" (2014)

DVD
No Woman's Land (2008)
Through A Lens Is All We Are (2009)
Words That Don't Exist (2012)

References

 http://www.sydonia.com.au/Sydonia%20bio%202009.pdf
 http://www.mp3.com.au/artist.asp?id=2297
 http://www.voltagemedia.com.au/news/2010/04/23/sydonia-work-with-colin-richardson
 http://www.myspace.com/sydonia

External links

 http://www.sydonia.com.au/
 http://www.myspace.com/sydonia
 http://www.reverbnation.com/sydonia
 http://www.facebook.com/pages/Sydonia/160337921708
 https://twitter.com/samsydonia
 https://www.youtube.com/samsydonia

Australian alternative rock groups
Australian heavy metal musical groups